Webcam software allows users to take pictures and video and save them to their computer.

See also 
 Comparison of screencasting software

Webcams
Webcam